The Derbyshire Record Office, established in 1962, is the county record office for Derbyshire, England. It holds archives and local studies material for the County of Derbyshire and the City of Derby and Diocese of Derby. It is situated in Matlock. The Record Office contains more than four miles of original Derbyshire records.

Derbyshire County Council has been collecting records since 1889, but it was not until 1962 the Derbyshire Record Office was opened. In 2013, the Local Studies Library in Matlock joined the Derbyshire Record Office. To enable this to happen the building was refurbished and an extension was built costing £4 million. The first County Archivist was Joan Sinar, previously County Archivist at Devon Record Office.  She was succeeded by Margaret O'Sullivan.

Archive Collection
Official records of the County council, City Council, Borough Councils, District Councils, Town Councils  and Parish councils along with their predecessors
Records for hospitals, workhouses, police, local courts, schools, wills and further education institutions
Diocesan and other church/parish records including the Diocese of Derby official records and registers for over 400 Anglican parishes. These include baptism, marriage and burial registers from the 16th century onwards
Registers of baptisms, marriages and burials in non-conformist chapels from the 17th century onwards
Other archives from Derbyshire industries, businesses, societies, charities, estates, families and voluntary groups
Manuscript and printed plans from the 17th century onwards including estate plans, tithe maps, enclosure maps and early ordnance survey maps

Local Studies Collection
Books including county, town and village histories
Journals
Newspapers such as the Matlock Mercury.
Old trade and telephone directories
Census 1841-1891 on microfilm and 1841-1911 via Ancestry.com
Old and modern Ordnance Survey and other mapping
Photographs and other illustration collections

References

Further reading

Archives in Derbyshire
History of Derbyshire
History of Derby
Organisations based in Derbyshire
Organizations established in 1962
County record offices in England
1962 establishments in England
Matlock, Derbyshire